Jesús Sánchez may refer to:
 Jesús Sánchez (pitcher) (born 1974), Dominican baseball pitcher
 Jesús Sánchez (outfielder) (born 1997), Dominican baseball outfielder 
 Jesús Sánchez (boxer), Dominican Republic boxer
 Jesús Sánchez (fencer), Mexican fencer
 Jesús Sánchez (volleyball) (born 1968), Spanish former volleyball player
 Jesús Rivera Sánchez, Secretary of the Puerto Rico Department of Education, 2010–2011
 Jesús Armando Sánchez (born 1984), Mexican footballer
 Jesús Sánchez García (born 1989), Mexican footballer
 Jesús Sánchez (racewalker) (born 1976), Mexican race walker